The Gagauz are an ethnic Turkic minority in Ukraine. The total number of the Gagauz diaspora was 31,923 counted in the 2001 census, most of whom (86.51%) live in the Bessarabian region of Odesa Oblast: Izmail, Reni, Kiliya, and Bolhrad raions (districts).

Place of residence
The Gagauz are speaking Gagauz language  who live in Ukraine, mainly in the Odesa region, where they make up 1.1% of the region's population. The number of Gagauz in the period between the 1989 and 2001 censuses increased by 0.9%, and the share of residents of the region - by 0.1%.

Regions of Ukraine by the number of Gagauz in 2001:

Gagauz live in the south and southwest of Odesa region in Bolhrad (18.7%), Reni (7.9%), Tarutyn (6.0%), Kiliya (3.8%) and Artsyz (1.8%) areas. The number of Gagauz increased in Ivanivsky (+ 100.0%), Ovidiopol (+ 100.0%), Bolhrad (+ 0.7%) districts and the city of Izmail (+ 14.3%), slightly decreased in Kiliysky (-14, 8%), Artsyz (-10.0%), Tarutyn (-6.9%) and Reni (-5.9%) districts.

The Gagauz also traditionally lived in the south of the Zaporizhzhia region, where they moved from Budzhak with Bulgarians and Albanians after the Crimean War. There the Gagauz population was present in the villages of Oleksandrivka, Vovchanske, Golivka, Dechnya, and Dimitrivka.

Language

The majority of Gagauz (71%) consider Gagauz their mother tongue, a significant proportion (23%) consider Russian their mother tongue.

Native language of Gagauz of Ukraine according to population censuses:

See also
Gagauz people in Moldova

References 

Ethnic groups in Ukraine
Gagauz people
Bessarabian ethnic groups
Odesa Oblast